Whitemans Brick was a brick manufacturing company in Middle Swan in Western Australia.

It was a company owned by Lou Whiteman, after whom Whiteman Park is named.

The land on which the operations were located were expanded in the 1920s. It was also notable in early usage of trucking materials due to shortage of railway facilities.

It was notable due to its large kilns.

It was taken over by Midland Brick in 1985.

References

Middle Swan, Western Australia
Brick manufacturers
Brickworks in Australia
Building materials companies of Australia